In mathematics, a sample-continuous process is a stochastic process whose sample paths are almost surely continuous functions.

Definition

Let (Ω, Σ, P) be a probability space. Let X : I × Ω → S be a stochastic process, where the index set I and state space S are both topological spaces. Then the process X is called sample-continuous (or almost surely continuous, or simply continuous) if the map X(ω) : I → S is continuous as a function of topological spaces for P-almost all ω in Ω.

In many examples, the index set I is an interval of time, [0, T] or [0, +∞), and the state space S is the real line or n-dimensional Euclidean space Rn.

Examples

 Brownian motion (the Wiener process) on Euclidean space is sample-continuous.
 For "nice" parameters of the equations, solutions to stochastic differential equations are sample-continuous. See the existence and uniqueness theorem in the stochastic differential equations article for some sufficient conditions to ensure sample continuity.
 The process X : [0, +∞) × Ω → R that makes equiprobable jumps up or down every unit time according to

 is not sample-continuous. In fact, it is surely discontinuous.

Properties

 For sample-continuous processes, the finite-dimensional distributions determine the law, and vice versa.

See also

 Continuous stochastic process

References

 

Stochastic processes